The Dill School is a historic school building in rural Cleburne County, Arkansas.  It is located a short way north of the village of Ida, on the west side of Arkansas Highway 5/25.  It is a single story stone structure, with a broad hipped roof and four "eyebrow dormers".  It has a pair of entrances sheltered by an arched projection that extends above the roof line.  The northern support column of the portico is marked by a stone indicating the year of construction (1938), and that it was built with funding from the National Youth Administration.  The building was used as a school until 1948, when its student population was consolidated into adjacent school districts.  It has since seen a variety of other uses.

The building was listed on the National Register of Historic Places in 1994.

See also
National Register of Historic Places listings in Cleburne County, Arkansas

References

School buildings on the National Register of Historic Places in Arkansas
School buildings completed in 1938
Buildings and structures in Cleburne County, Arkansas
National Register of Historic Places in Cleburne County, Arkansas
National Youth Administration